The A-League Goal of the Month is an association football award that recognises the player who is deemed to have scored the best A-League goal each month of the season from October to May. The winner is chosen by a combination of an online public vote in the official A-League website.

As of May 2019, Perth Glory player Diego Castro won the latest A-League Goal of the Month award.

Winners

Awards won by player

Awards won by club

Awards won by nationality

References

A-League Men trophies and awards
Australian soccer trophies and awards